A Stubborn Cinderella is a musical in three acts originally produced by Mort H. Singer Jr. The music is by Joseph E. Howard, book and lyrics are by William M. Hough and Frank R. Adams.  Staged by George Marion and Musical Direction by Arthur Pell, the scenic design was by Frank E. Gates and Edward A. Morange.  It opened at the Broadway Theatre on January 25, 1909 and played for 88 performances.

Opening night cast
 John Barrymore – Mac
 Dorothy Brenner – Sallie
 Alice Dovey – Lois
 Sallie Fisher – Lady Leslie, daughter of the Earl of Glenkirk
 Robert Harrington – Skeeter
 James C. Marlowe – Colonel Hunt, of the visiting English party
 Charles Prince – Fat
 Clarence Lutz – Grid
 Don Merrifield – The President/an Indian
 Charles Rankin – Thaddeus Leonardo, a famous sculptor
 Helen Salinger – Lady Evelyn, Lady Leslie's aunt

Songs

Act I
 "Love Me Just Because" – Lois and Chorus
 "Don't Be Cross with Me" – Lady Leslie and Chorus
 "I'm in Love with All the Girls I Know" – Skeeter and Chorus

Act 2
 "None But the Brave Deserve the Fair" – Colonel Hunt and Chorus
 "The Land of the Sky"
 "Adios, Senorita" – Sallie and Chorus
 "Don't Be Anybody's Moon But Mine" – Lois and Chorus

Act 3
 "Don't Teach Me to Swim Alone" – Sallie and Chorus
 "If They'd Only Let Poor Adam's Rib Alone" – Mac, Colonel Hunt, Skeeter and Fat
 "The Orange Fete" – Ensemble
 "When You First Kiss the Last Girl You Love" – Lady Leslie

External links

Broadway musicals
1909 musicals